Paluan, officially the Municipality of Paluan,  is a 3rd class municipality in the province of Occidental Mindoro, Philippines. According to the 2020 census, it has a population of 18,566 people.

Geography
The town is located at the north-western tip of Mindoro Island. It lies along the north-east shore of Paluan Bay, approximately 7 miles southeast of Cape Calavite, a major sea-lane for inter-island and ocean-going vessels. At Mount Calavite point, the best panoramic view of Occidental Mindoro and nearby islands could be seen.

Paluan is a predominantly rural municipality, characterized by natural vegetation and an economy based mostly on agriculture. Its dominant land use is forest cover. Forestland occupies  or 56% of total land area, planted with patches of fruit bearing trees and upland field crops. A large portion of forestland is restricted as a preservation area for wildlife and watershed, the  Mount Calavite Wildlife Sanctuary. This area, which also includes Mount Calavite, is a habitat of various flora and fauna, such as the rare Mindoro tamaraw and the critically endangered Mindoro bleeding-heart (Gallicolumba platenae).

Agricultural lands cover  or 24% of the total land area. Open grasslands cover 18% or  utilized for pasture.

Barangays
Paluan is politically subdivided into 12 barangays.

 Alipaoy
 Harrison
 Lumangbayan
 Mananao
 Marikit
 Mapalad Pob. (Barangay 1)
 Handang Tumulong Pob. (Barangay 2)
 Silahis Ng Pag-Asa Pob. (Barangay 3)
 Pag-Asa Ng Bayan Pob. (Barangay 4)
 Bagong Silang Pob. (Barangay 5)
 San Jose Pob. (Barangay 6)
 Tubili

Climate

Economy

History

Paluan became a municipality on January 5, 1901, but its history dates back to the early 17th century when the village was known as the Religious District of Calavite.

Demographics

References

External links
Paluan Profile at PhilAtlas.com
[ Philippine Standard Geographic Code]
Philippine Census Information
Local Governance Performance Management System

Municipalities of Occidental Mindoro